"No Myth" is a song by rock singer Michael Penn from his debut album March.

Released as his debut single in the fall of 1989, the song became Penn's only top 40 hit on the U.S. Billboard Hot 100, peaking at #13. A vintage electro-mechanical keyboard instrument Chamberlin was used by Patrick Warren in the song and can be seen in the video as well.

Track listing
CD single
"No Myth" (Edited version) - 4:11
"Big House" - 2:57
"No Myth" (Damascus mix) - 4:45

Chart performance

Weekly charts

Year-end charts

References

External links

1989 debut singles
Michael Penn songs
1989 songs
RCA Records singles
Songs written by Michael Penn